Nohoval is a village located in County Cork, Ireland. St. Patrick's  and Nohoval Parish Church are located in the village. 

Local features 
Nohoval's name originally came from the shortening of the Irish language name of "Nuachong-Bhail" or "Nuhongval", which meant "new habitation" when translated. The village is home to Nohoval Cove, a small cove on the west of Ireland coastline near the Wild Atlantic Way. The area surrounding it is full of abandoned old lime kilns. The village had a local shop, which closed in 2018, and a local pub. The pub was closed, however it later went to auction in 2019, with the sale including the pub's licence to sell alcohol for €225,000.

In 1840, a three-storey mill was erected as part of a suspected Irish Famine relief project.  It was built overlooking Man of War Cove (also called Smuggler's Cove), where numerous shipwrecks occurred. It had fallen into ruin until 1994 when it was restored and converted into a private dwelling.

Churches 
Nohoval's Church of Ireland parish church is Nohoval Church, also known as St Peter's Church, and is under the ecclesiastic jurisdiction of the Diocese of Cork, Cloyne and Ross. The church's vestry, called Glebe House, was constructed in 1816 and was home to the vicar of the church until 1978 when a widow of one of the clergymen purchased it from the Church of Ireland with the aim of making it into a hotel which never materialised. The Roman Catholic Church in the village is represented by St Patrick's Church in the Diocese of Cork and Ross. The Catholic church also support the local primary school, Scoil Nuachabháil, with the Bishop of Kerry opening a new extension in 2019.

See also
 List of towns and villages in Ireland

References

Towns and villages in County Cork
Articles on towns and villages in Ireland possibly missing Irish place names
Civil parishes of County Cork